Karim (also, Kareem or Kerim) is a given name and a surname of Arabic origin. It may also refer to:

Places
 Karim, Iran, a village in Kashkan Rural District, Shahivand District, Dowreh County, Lorestan Province, Iran
 Nahr-e Karim, a village in Nasar Rural District, Arvandkenar District, Abadan County, Khuzestan Province, Iran

Other uses
 Karim (record label), Italian record label active from 1960 to 1966, when it closed
 Karim's, a restaurant in Delhi, India

See also

 
 
 
 
 Careem, Middle Eastern ride share car hailing app company
Karie (disambiguation)
 Kerim (name)